The following is a list of episodes for the British fly on the wall reality television series, It's All About Amy: 

In 2011/12, eight episodes of It's All About Amy aired.

Episodes

Series 1 (2011/12)

References

Lists of British non-fiction television series episodes
Lists of reality television series episodes